The 2017 Rally Finland was the ninth round of the 2017 World Rally Championship and was the 67th running of the Rally Finland. Esapekka Lappi and Janne Ferm won the rally, their first win in the WRC.

Jari Huttunen won the WRC-2 category, his first in the series.

Entry list

Classification

Event standings

Special stages

Power Stage
The Power Stage was a  stage at the end of the rally.

Championship standings after the rally

Drivers' Championship standings

Manufacturers' Championship standings

References

External links
 The official website of the World Rally Championship

2017 World Rally Championship season
Rally Finland
2017 in Finnish sport
July 2017 sports events in Europe